Madhire Ravinder Reddy is an Indian producer and the owner of Dwaraka Creations. Its latest production is Hotel Beautifool. The film stars Rejith Menon, Johny Lever, Brijendra Kala, Jia Sharma, Shaanti, Sagarika Chettri, Vishavpreet Kaur, Alisha Farrer, Imam Siddique and Sandeep Ghosh.

Hotel Beautifool 
Hotel Beautifool is based on the popular Hindi play Baat Baat mein Bigdey haalaat, written and directed by Sameer Iqbal Patel. Patel was planning to make it into a film when Mohammed Aslam Shaikh and Madhire Ravinder Reddy saw the play and decided to join with Patel in making it into a Hindi feature film.

The first shoot started at Mumbai's future studio on 20 July 2014 and completed on 29 July.  The second shoot ran from 27 September 2014 in Morjim, Goa.

References

Hindi film producers
Living people
Year of birth missing (living people)
Place of birth missing (living people)